The Lebanon Reporter is a daily newspaper serving Lebanon, Indiana, and adjacent portions of Boone County, Indiana.

History 
It was founded in 1891. It is owned by Community Newspaper Holdings Inc.

In May 2021, The Zionsville Times-Sentinel merged with The Lebanon Reporter.

The paper's marketing slogan is "Something for Everyone."

References

External links 
 The Lebanon Reporter Website
 CNHI Website

Newspapers published in Indiana
Boone County, Indiana